Panocha, in New Mexico and southern Colorado, is a pudding made from ground sprouted wheat and piloncillo. It is traditionally eaten during Lent. The sprouted-wheat flour is called "panocha flour" or simply "panocha", as well.

In southern Arizona, Sonora, and Sinaloa, is the word for piloncillo. In some regions of Spain (e.g. Aragón), una panocha de maiz is an ear of corn.

In the Philippines, panocha (also spelled panutsa or panotsa) is the Spanish term for sangkaka, a traditional native jaggery made in halved coconut shells. The term is also used to refer to a type of peanut brittle in the Philippines (more properly panocha mani).

In other regions, "panocha" can mean penuche or panuche. In Spanish slang, it is a taboo word for the vulva, a fact that has led to many deliberate and accidental puns. It can also mean a coward.

References

External links
  

Mexican cuisine
New Mexican cuisine
Cuisine of the Southwestern United States
Lenten foods
Puddings
Philippine cuisine